ECW Hardcore TV is an American professional wrestling television program that was produced by the Philadelphia based promotion Extreme Championship Wrestling (ECW) composed of footage from live shows and recorded interviews. It ran in syndication from April 6, 1993 to December 31, 2000.

Even after ECW gained a nationally-available television program on The Nashville Network (TNN), Hardcore TV was considered ECW's flagship program. The rights to the show now belong to the WWE. The show was voted as Best Weekly Television Show in the 1994, 1995 and 1996 Wrestling Observer Newsletter Awards.

Format
Hardcore TV was edited from footage of ECW's live events from the ECW Arena and other house shows. It also included backstage promos & vignettes, which were not shown to the live crowd or included on home video releases of the events. A segment called Hype Central advertised upcoming events and ECW merchandise in a tongue in cheek manner.

Music videos from major musical acts were sometimes shown, interspersed with footage detailing the history of current feuds, as well as spectacular spots. Frequently, the ending of the show would feature a montage of several different promos, with Dick Dale's cover version of "Misirlou" as background music. These became known as "Pulp Fiction promos". The purpose of these promos was to maximize the show's limited airtime in order to keep the fans up to date with current wrestling storylines.

In keeping with ECW's unconventional approach, episodes were not structured with a build toward a main event as with typical professional wrestling programming. Any given week's program could feature any number of matches or match type. Owner/producer Paul Heyman's intent was to keep things fresh by providing variety for the viewers.

Censorship and content
Hardcore TV showed graphic violence (including blood), sexual frankness, and harsh language, all of which were key elements of the ECW product itself. Due to the late night time slots, expletives and violence were not edited from early broadcasts, and this helped to get ECW noticed. After the ECW on TNN program became available, this was a major difference between the syndicated Hardcore TV and the more mainstream program on TNN.

Broadcast history

Philadelphia market
Hardcore TV aired in permanent time slots in ECW's home territories of Philadelphia and New York City, and was also syndicated. Shows were broadcast on a Philadelphia local cable sports station, SportsChannel America's local affiliate, SportsChannel Philadelphia, on Tuesday evenings at 6pm until January 9, 1997 when the show moved to Thursdays at 11pm.  In April 1996, the ECW SportsChannel airings were upgraded to 6pm and 11pm on Tuesdays, with a late night Friday replay at 2am. After SportsChannel Philadelphia went off the air in 1997, the show moved to WPPX-TV 61 on Wednesdays at 9pm. It later moved to a former independent broadcast station, WGTW 48 in Philadelphia, on late Friday or Saturday night broadcasts.

Chicago/Northwest Indiana market
In the Chicago and Northwest Indiana market, the show traded back and forth among WCIU 26 on Saturdays, and UPN station WPWR 50, broadcast in both Chicago and Gary, on Friday nights, a week behind. Meanwhile, KBS Chicago (a Korean station that also carried Big Japan shows at midnight) broadcast Hardcore TV on Friday nights.

Orlando market
WRBW in Orlando aired Hardcore TV in a very late night timeslot on Saturdays. Also, WNFM (then known as WSWF), a cable only WB affiliate in Fort Myers, aired Hardcore TV in a primetime slot on Saturday Nights. The rest of Florida got Hardcore TV on regional sports network the Sunshine Network very late on Friday nights. WRBW invoked syndex, meaning ECW was blacked out in the Orlando market on Sunshine.

New York area
Beginning on January 7, 1995, ECW Hardcore TV aired on the MSG Network in New York City and the surrounding area at 1 am (late Friday night/early Saturday morning). Empire Sports Network (western NY) and WBGT-LP (Rochester) also carried the show.

Pittsburgh market
WPTT-TV in Pittsburgh, Pennsylvania aired Hardcore TV late on Saturday nights. The station, now known as WPNT and owned by the Sinclair Broadcast Group (which at the time operated the station on a local marketing agreement with sidecar Glencairn, Ltd. alongside WPGH-TV, which Sinclair owned outright), now airs Ring of Honor Wrestling from Sinclair-owned Ring of Honor, which is often seen as the spiritual successor to ECW.

Other markets in the United States
Shows were aired on KJLA in Los Angeles on Saturday nights, WUNI in Worcester-Boston very late on Friday nights, WBVC TV-61 in Traverse City, Michigan late Friday Nights, WUCT TV-52 in Dayton, Ohio, The Cat in Cleveland and Akron, Ohio late Friday nights, WPEN in Hampton Roads, Virginia on Saturday evenings, and WGMB Fox 44 in Baton Rouge, Louisiana on Saturday afternoons and late night. It also aired very late on Friday nights on KTSF TV-26 in San Francisco, California, on Fridays at 11 on KGMC 43 in Fresno, California, KCNG-TV and UPN25 in Las Vegas, Nevada at 1pm on Saturdays, and on SportsSouth in Georgia, Alabama, Mississippi, Tennessee, Kentucky, North Carolina, and South Carolina.

Additional networks
America One Network
Bravo (British TV channel)

Online Streaming
Episodes were at one time available for download on the websites of some affiliate stations.

All episodes are available for streaming on WWE Network.

See also

ECW on TNN
List of professional wrestling television series

References

External links
 

American professional wrestling television series
First-run syndicated television programs in the United States
Extreme Championship Wrestling shows
1993 American television series debuts
2000 American television series endings
SportsChannel